A cheeseburger is a hamburger topped with cheese. 

Cheeseburger may also refer to:

Cheeseburger (band), an American hard rock band
Cheeseburger (wrestler), or World Famous CB, American professional wrestler
OnePlus 5, codenamed cheeseburger, a smartphone
"Cheeseburger", a song by Gang of Four from Solid Gold